The Geological Society of South Africa (GSSA) is a learned society for geological science that was founded in 1895, making it one of the oldest such societies in Africa.  The GSSA publishes the peer-reviewed scientific journal, the South African Journal of Geology, and annually awards the Draper Memorial Medal (in honour of David Draper) to recognise achievement in geology, and the Des Pretorius Memorial Award (in honour of Desmond Pretorius) to recognise exceptional work on economic geology in Africa.

External links
 Geological Society of South Africa website
 South African Journal of Geology website

South Africa
Learned societies of South Africa
Geology of South Africa
Scientific organizations established in 1895
1895 establishments in Africa